Carpenter was an unincorporated community in Bernalillo County, New Mexico, United States, located 15 miles east of Albuquerque.  A post office was operated in the community from 1903 to 1907.  It was named in honor of its first postmaster, José R. Carpenter.  The Carpenter name had existed earlier in the area: Henry Carpenter operated a large ranch in the Juan Tomás area in the 1880s.

References

Unincorporated communities in New Mexico
Unincorporated communities in Bernalillo County, New Mexico